Alsodes monticola (common name: island spiny-chest frog) is a species of frog in the family Alsodidae. It is found in southern Chile and western Santa Cruz Province, Argentina, though its presence in Argentina is disputed. Its habitat preferences are not known, but the region of the type locality (the island of Inchy, in the Chonos Archipelago) has tundra and islands of Nothofagus forest.

References

monticola
Amphibians of Patagonia
Amphibians of Argentina
Amphibians of Chile
Taxa named by Thomas Bell (zoologist)
Amphibians described in 1843
Taxonomy articles created by Polbot